The Pleiße is a river of Saxony and Thuringia, Germany.

The Pleiße has its source southwest of Zwickau at Ebersbrunn, then flows through Werdau, Crimmitschau, Altenburg, and other towns and villages in Saxony and Thuringia, before flowing from the right into the White Elster in Leipzig.

See also 
 Kleine Pleiße
 Leipzig River Network
 List of rivers of Saxony
 List of rivers of Thuringia

Notes
The information in this article is based on and/or translated from its German equivalent.

External links 

Rivers of Saxony
Rivers of Thuringia
Rivers of Germany